Acochlidium fijiiensis is a species of freshwater gastropod, an aquatic gastropod mollusc within the family Acochlidiidae. Acochlidium fijiiensis has no shell.

This species lives in two rivers on Fiji.

References

Further reading
 Haase M. & Wawra E. (1996). "The genital system of Acochlidium fijiense (Opisthobranchia: Acochlidioidea) and its inferred function". Malacologia 38: 143-151.

External links
 https://web.archive.org/web/20110727113118/http://www.naturefiji.org/endspecies.php?info=Acochlidium%20fijiense

Acochlidiidae
Gastropods described in 1991